Fremont Township is one of twenty townships in Fayette County, Iowa, USA.  As of the 2010 census, its population was 560.

Geography
According to the United States Census Bureau, Fremont Township covers an area of 37.03 square miles (95.92 square kilometers).

Cities, towns, villages
 Westgate

Adjacent townships
 Banks Township (north)
 Center Township (northeast)
 Harlan Township (east)
 Jefferson Township (southeast)
 Oran Township (south)
 Franklin Township, Bremer County (southwest)
 Dayton Township, Bremer County (west)
 Sumner No. 2 Township, Bremer County (northwest)

Cemeteries
The township contains these three cemeteries: Calvary, Greenwood and Saint Peter.

Landmarks
 Downing County Park

School districts
 Sumner-Fredericksburg Community School District
 Wapsie Valley Community School District
 West Central Community School District

Political districts
 Iowa's 1st congressional district
 State House District 18
 State Senate District 9

References
 United States Census Bureau 2008 TIGER/Line Shapefiles
 United States Board on Geographic Names (GNIS)
 United States National Atlas

External links
 US-Counties.com
 City-Data.com

Townships in Fayette County, Iowa
Townships in Iowa